Brody  is an air base of Ukrainian Army Aviation located near Brody, Lviv Oblast, Ukraine.

The base is home to the 16th Separate Army Aviation Brigade flying Mil Mi-8, Mil Mi-9 & Mil Mi-24 aircraft.

The base was used by the:
 807th Assault Aviation Regiment which became the 807th Fighter-Bomber Aviation Regiment in 1956, it then became the 55th independent Helicopter Regiment in 1961. (August 1945 - April 1981)
 119th independent Helicopter Regiment (1981 - 1992)

References

RussianAirFields.com

Soviet Air Force bases
Soviet Frontal Aviation
Ukrainian airbases